Semikron is a German-based independent manufacturer of power semiconductor components. The company was founded in 1951 by Dr. Friedrich Josef Martin in Nuremberg. In 2019, the company has a staff of more than 3,000 people in 24 subsidiaries (world-wide) with production sites in Germany, Brazil, China, France, India, Italy, Slovakia and the USA. 

Semikron is a provider of integrated circuits, discrete semiconductors, transistor, diode and thyristor power modules, power assemblies and systems for markets such as industrial drives, wind and solar, hybrid and electric vehicles, the rail industry and power supplies. According to a survey carried out by BTM Consult ApS, the total wind power capacity installed until 2009 was 122 gigawatts. Out of this, 57 gigawatts comprises power semiconductors from Semikron.

In the field of diode/thyristor modules, Semikron is the market leader with a 30% share of the worldwide market.

In March 2022, SEMIKRON and Danfoss Silicon Power announced their merger to establish Semikron Danfoss as the ultimate partner in power electronics. On August 22, 2022, less than five months after it was first announced, the new leader in power semiconductor modules started doing business as Semikron Danfoss.

Products
Semikron's product range consists of 11,600 different power semiconductors from 1 kW to 10 MW, including chips, discrete diodes/thyristors, power modules (IGBT / MOSFET / diode / thyristor/CIB/IPM), driver and protection components and integrated subsystems.

Amongst other developments Semikron invented the world's first isolated power module, the Semipack, of which 56 million are presently in use.

Important innovations of the organization:

2010 SKAI 3 phase converter system up to 250 kVA
2009 SKiiP4 intelligent power module with 3600 A; for use in wind and traction applications
2008 MiniSKiiP IPM first intelligent power module for solder-free assembly
2008 SKYPER with fully digital signal processing
2007 SKiM 100% solder-free IGBT modules for hybrid vehicles
2007 Sinter Technology - reliable sintering replaces solder process
2006 SEMiSTART for soft-start devices
2005 SEMiX rectifiers with solder-free spring contacts for electrical connections
2004 SKYPER IGBT driver family
2003 SEMiX first flat IGBT half-bridge family from 250 to 900 A with solder-free spring contacts for electrical connections
2002 MiniSKiiPII 2nd generation of Converter-Inverter-Brake modules up to 30 kW
2001 Integrated converters for hybrid electric drives
2000 Low-power rectifiers: standard, fast and super-fast axial diodes, Schottky diodes, Zener diodes, press-fit diodes, low-level rectifier bridges and SMDs
1999 SKiM 6-Pack IGBT modules with driver electronics
1998 SEMITOP rectifier circuits with solder pins for PCB assembly
1996 MiniSKiiP first integrated IGBT rectifier circuits in solder-free spring contact technology
1996 Spring Technology - spring contacts allow for solder-free electrical connections
1995 ASICs optimise the electronic assemblies used to control MOSFET and IGBT modules
1992 Fast, soft freewheeling diode with best properties in the world (CAL-Diode)
1992 SKiiP, the first IPMs (Intelligent Power Modules) with integrated driver and SKiiP pressure contact technology 100-1200 A / 600-1200 V for high-power applications
1992 SKiiP Technology - pressure contact technology, no soldered copper base plate, fewer solder layers, extended service life
1987 SEMITRANS MOSFET modules for electric vehicles, high-frequency generators, inductive heating and lasers
1984 Bi-polar Darlington transistor modules SEMITRANS
1981 SEMIPACK modules with fast thyristors and diodes. Introduction of glass passivation and square chips
1976 Disc-type thyristors for DC drives and AC converters
1974 SEMIPACK, the world's first isolated thyristor/diode module, now an industrial standard in its 6th generation. Today, SEMIKRON is global market leader for diode/thyristor modules
1967 The first thyristors for variable-speed DC drives, 3-phase soft-start devices and 3-phase AC power controllers
1964 The world's first 1A plastic diode for direct PCB assembly for use in radios and TV sets
1963 The first encapsulated bridge rectifier, a revolutionary plastic bridge that established itself across the entire electronics industry
1961 Development of the first avalanche rectifier diode in the world
1959 First silicon diode made of silicon wafers. At this time, the power range of 2.5 - 300 A was an astonishingly high value
1954 Start of SEMIKRON semiconductor manufacturing: selenium rectifier plates and selenium surge voltage protective devices

Applications
According to Semikron, 40% of yearly installed wind in 2022 contains its technology. "Semikron inside" has become a trademark for new markets such as renewable energy sources and hybrid vehicles as well as industrial applications such as electric drives, welding machines, lifts, power supplies, pumps, conveyor belts, trains and trams.

Literature 
 Application Manual Power Semiconductors

Sources

External links
 www.semikron-danfoss.com

Manufacturing companies based in Nuremberg
Electronics companies of Germany